, commonly known as TOPIX, along with the Nikkei 225, is an important stock market index for the Tokyo Stock Exchange (TSE) in Japan, tracking all domestic companies of the exchange's Prime market division. It is calculated and published by the TSE. , there were 1,669 companies listed on the First Section of the TSE, and the market value for the index was ¥197.4 trillion.

The index transitioned from a system where a company's weighting is based on the total number of shares outstanding to a weighting based on the number of shares available for trading (called the free float). This transition took place in three phases starting in October 2005 and was completed in June 2006. Although the change is a technicality, it had a significant effect on the weighting of many companies in the index, because many companies in Japan hold a significant number of shares of their business partners as a part of intricate business alliances, and such shares are no longer included in calculating the weight of companies in the index.

The TOPIX index is traded as a future on the Osaka Exchange under the ticker symbol JTPX. The CQG contract specifications for the TOPIX Index are listed below.

TSE currently calculates and distributes TOPIX every second and further plans to launch a new High-Speed Index dissemination service provided at the millisecond level starting from February 28, 2011.

History of TOPIX
1969-07-01　TSE to begin calculating and publishing “TOPIX” and “TOPIX Sector Indices”
1969-08-18　TSE to begin calculating and publishing “Tokyo Stock Exchange Second Section Stock Price Index”
1988-09-03　TOPIX Future Trades begin at TSE
1989-10-20　TOPIX Option Trades begin at TSE
1998-08-02　TSE to begin calculating and publishing “TOPIX New Index Series”
1999-02-01　TSE to begin calculating and publishing “TOPIX Total Return Index”
2001-07-13　TOPIX ETF Trades begin TSE
2003-08-01　TSE to begin calculating and publishing “Tokyo Stock Exchange REIT Index”
2003-09-16　TSE to begin calculating and publishing “Tokyo Stock Exchange Mothers Index”
2005-10-31 Introduction of Free Float Adjusted Indices (Shift in three phases)
2005-11-17 Lyxor AM (Lyxor Asset Management) introduces Lyxor ETF Japan (TOPIX) for trading on Euronext Paris
2006-04-05 Lyxor (Societe Generale) lists on Borsa Italiana the world's most cost-effective and diversified Japan-based UCITS III compliant ETF with TOPIX as the underlying index
2006-04-25 Development of New Custom Index that incorporates Corporate Social Responsibility (CSR)
2006-06-30　Free Float adjustment for TOPIX completed
2006-08-09 TOPIX for the first time available as ETFs in Germany – Start of trading in Deutsche Borse's XTFsegment – Lyxor AM continues to expand investment universe
2007-08-21 Lyxor AM, SGX and TSE introduce first Japan ETF in Singapore based on TOPIX
2007-09-25 London Stock Exchange, Tokyo Stock Exchange, Inc. and Lyxor AM announce listing of Lyxor ETF Japan in London
2007-11-21 Standard & Poor's Launches New Shariah Index for Japan
2007-12-10  TSE begins calculating and publishing new sector indices, the "TOPIX-17 Series"
2008-02-20 Korea Exchange, Tokyo Stock Exchange, Inc. and Samsung Investment Trust Management Co.,Ltd. announce listing of KODEX Japan ETF (TOPIX 100) in Seoul
2008-06-03 Lyxor AM and TSE introduce first Japan ETF in Hong Kong based on TOPIX®
2008-07-25 Listing of TOPIX ETF in the US
2009-02-09 TSE to begin calculating and publishing "TOPIX Style Index Series" and "TOPIX Composite Index Series"
2009-04-01 Daily reporting of TOPIX on the CCTV Economic Channel begins
2009-05-22 TSE to begin to offer Historical Data of TOPIX Style Index Series
2009-07-01 TOPIX celebrates 40th Anniversary
2009-11-24 TOPIX Futures to trade on NYSE Liffe beginning in the summer of 2010
2010-03-08 TSE to begin calculation of the Tokyo Stock Exchange Dividend Focus 100 Index – a new exchange index focused on dividend yield
2010-06-18 TSE to begin calculating and publishing "Tokyo Stock Exchange REIT Property Sector Index Series" – a new index series focused on REITs' Investment Property Sectors
2010-09-13 Real-time dissemination of "Tokyo Stock Exchange REIT Property Sector Index Series" begins

Statistics (close price)

TOPIX Component

TOPIX New Index Series

 New companies which have not been listed on the TSE for 6 months or more, out of the companies listed on the 1st section of the TSE

TOPIX 100 companies

See also

 Nikkei 225

References

External links 

Bloomberg page for TPX:IND
 TSE: Stock price index – real time
 TSE: Index Value Data
 TOPIX profile at Wikinvest

1967 establishments in Japan
 
Japanese stock market indices
Tokyo Stock Exchange